Encore: Movie Partners Sing Broadway is the thirty-fifth studio album by American singer and songwriter Barbra Streisand, released on August 26, 2016 by Columbia Records.  Encore debuted at the top of the US Billboard 200 chart, extending Streisand's record as the woman with the most number-one albums in chart history., and the oldest woman to have a No. 1 album in the Billboard 200. The album also reached number one in Australia and the United Kingdom, where it became her third and seventh chart-topper respectively. Encore: Movie Partners Sing Broadway received a nomination for Best Traditional Pop Vocal Album at the 59th Annual Grammy Awards held in February 2017.

Commercial performance

The first leg of Barbra: The Music, The Mem'ries, The Magic concert tour preceded the album release, helping promote the duets collection.  Encore: Movie Partners Sing Broadway debuted at number one on the Billboard 200, selling 149,000 album-equivalent units in its first week, of which 148,000 were pure sales. Of that figure, physical album sales (CDs and vinyl LPs) equated to 126,000, the largest sales week for a physical album in 2016. Previously, Blink-182's California held the biggest physical week for an album of 2016, with 107,000 sold. Encore extended her record for the most number one albums among women, tying her with Bruce Springsteen for the third-most among all acts. The only artists with more number ones are The Beatles (with 19) and Jay Z (with 13).

Streisand also surpassed her own record for the longest span between number ones on the Billboard 200 as Encore arrived 51 years and 10 months after her first chart-topper, People, spent its initial week at number one (October 31, 1964). Further, Streisand continued to be the only act to have achieved number one albums in the last six decades (1960s–2010s).

The album debuted at number one on the UK Albums Chart with combined units of 20,000 in its first week, giving Streisand her seventh number one album in the United Kingdom. With that achievement, Streisand ranks second as the female solo artist with the most number one albums in UK, behind only Madonna, who has twelve number one albums. The feat was later broken by Kylie Minogue, who has eight number one albums. It also peaked at number 3 in Canada, selling 10,318 copies in its first week. The album debuted at number one spot in Australia, making it her third number one album there.

Encore was the 45th best-selling album of 2016, according to IFPI, selling 600,000 that year.

Track listing

Charts

Weekly charts

Year-end charts

Certifications

References

External links
Barbra Archives: Encore: Movie Partners Sing Broadway (2016)

2016 albums
Barbra Streisand albums
Vocal duet albums
Albums produced by Walter Afanasieff
Columbia Records albums
Covers albums